The 2012 888真人 Welsh Open was a professional ranking snooker tournament that took place between 13 and 19 February 2012 at the Newport Centre in Newport, Wales. This was the first time, that 888真人 sponsored the event.

John Higgins was the defending champion, but he lost 3–4 against Ding Junhui in the last 16.

Ding Junhui won his fifth ranking title by defeating Mark Selby 9–6 in the final.

Prize fund
The breakdown of prize money for this year is shown below: 

Winner: £30,000
Runner-up: £15,000
Semi-final: £7,500
Quarter-final: £5,600
Last 16: £4,000
Last 32: £2,500
Last 48: £1,600
Last 64: £1,250

Stage one highest break: £500
Stage two highest break: £1,000
Total: £201,500

Main draw

Final

Qualifying
These matches were held between 8 and 11 February 2012 at the World Snooker Academy, Sheffield, England.

Century breaks

Qualifying stage centuries 
 

 142, 113, 111  Andy Hicks
 141, 116, 100  Sam Baird
 138  Stuart Carrington
 137  Paul Davison
 135  Kurt Maflin
 134, 112  David Morris
 134  Tom Ford
 128  Yu Delu
 126  Adam Duffy
 123, 120, 104  Xiao Guodong

 122, 101  Barry Hawkins
 113  Gerard Greene
 113  Steve Davis
 112, 109  David Gilbert
 112  Liu Chuang
 111  Mike Dunn
 108, 106  Ian McCulloch
 106  Tony Drago
 102  Marco Fu

Televised stage centuries 

 145, 124, 110, 103  Mark Selby
 141  Matthew Stevens
 139, 125, 102, 101  Ronnie O'Sullivan
 136  Sam Baird
 135  Neil Robertson
 133  Mark Williams
 131, 111, 101  Stephen Maguire

 130, 124  Ding Junhui
 129  Stephen Lee
 126  Shaun Murphy
 123  Barry Hawkins
 121, 117  Steve Davis
 121  Mark Allen
 109, 104, 100  Judd Trump

References

2012
Welsh Open
Open (snooker)
Welsh Open snooker in Newport